Ben Webb may refer to:

 Ben Webb (journalist) (1957–2002), Canadian journalist
 Ben Webb (artist) (1976–2014), New Zealand-born artist
 Trent Seven (born 1981), British wrestler whose birth name is Ben Webb

See also
 Benjamin Joseph Webb (1814–1897), Catholic editor, senator and historian 
Benji Webbe (born 1967), Welsh singer